Oglasodes is a genus of moths of the family Erebidae. The genus was erected by George Hampson in 1926.

Species
Oglasodes atrisignata Hampson, 1926 Ghana
Oglasodes bisinuata Hampson, 1926 Ghana
Oglasodes nyasica Hampson, 1926 Kenya, Malawi

References

Calpinae